Nguyễn An Ninh is a ward of Vũng Tàu in Bà Rịa–Vũng Tàu province, Vietnam.

References

Communes of Bà Rịa-Vũng Tàu province
Populated places in Bà Rịa-Vũng Tàu province